Vorbasse with a population of 1,300 (1 January 2022) is the 4th largest town in Billund Municipality,  Region of Southern Denmark, Denmark.

Annually, the biggest market in Denmark is arranged, Vorbasse Market (running for the 288th year, as of 2018), with approximately 250,000 visitors. The town is also renowned for having its own little naval port, Vorbasse Krigshavn, actually a village pond dominated by the bridge of a former Russian submarine from 1988 until its removal during the 2003 renovation. It still harbours the model warship 'Labri', which is ceremonially launched every Easter.

In archaeology Vorbasse is well known for its large scale excavations of a settlement that had existed from the 1st century BC to the 11th century AD. The settlement consisted of a number of identical farms spread along a central street. The farm buildings, each set within its own large enclosure, contained a long house  with generally sloping stone walls built without mortar and several smaller surrounding annexes. The roof of the long house tended to be curved with the centre being higher than the ends.

Notable people 
 Henrik Dam Kristensen (born 1957 in Vorbasse) a Danish politician and the current speaker of the Danish parliament

External links
Vorbasse's official website
Vorbasse Market's official website
Camping Vorbasse
Billund municipality's official website
New Billund municipality's official website

References

Cities and towns in the Region of Southern Denmark
Billund Municipality